Paul Giger (born 1952 in Herisau, Switzerland), is a Swiss violinist and composer. He plays contemporary classical music, jazz, and free improvised music, and specializes in extended techniques.

He has released six CDs on the ECM label and collaborated with the Hilliard Ensemble, Jan Garbarek, Pierre Favre and Marie-Louise Dähler.

Discography 
Chartres (ECM, 1989)
Alpstein (ECM, 1991)
Schattenwelt (ECM, 1993)
Ignis (ECM, 1998)
Vindonissa (ECM, 2003)
Towards Silence (ECM, 2007)
trans limen ad lumen (DIVOX, 2017)

External links
 Paul Giger official site

1952 births
Living people
Swiss composers
Swiss male composers
Swiss violinists
Male violinists
ECM Records artists
21st-century violinists
21st-century male musicians